Lazuri is a commune of 5,500 inhabitants situated in Satu Mare County, Romania. It is composed of six villages:

Lazuri has three sister cities: Balkány in Hungary, Chlebnice in Slovakia and Słopnice in Poland.

Demographics
Ethnic groups (2002 census):
Hungarians: 80.17%
Romanians: 14.71%
Romanies (Gypsies): 4.71%

According to mother tongue, 85.13% of the population speak Hungarian as their first language.

References

Communes in Satu Mare County